Filippo Mancuso (22 July 1922 – 30 May 2011) was an Italian judge and politician. In 1995 he was Italy's Minister of Justice in the government of Lamberto Dini. The Italian Senate voted a motion of no confidence against him and this fact was the first time during the republican period. The left wing and Lega Nord complained about the review of the Mani pulite pool during Tangentopoli. He was elected for the first time as deputy in 1996 Italian general election with Forza Italia party and he was confirmed in the 2001 general elections. He left Forza Italia in 2002, because he was not elected to the Constitutional Court of Italy because of opposition of the left wing. Mancuso agreed with Silvio Berlusconi to nominate another person for the Supreme Court, possibly Mario Serio, but then Forza Italia denoted Romano Vaccarella, a close friend of Cesare Previti. After 2006 Mancuso retired to private life until his death

References

 http://interviste.sabellifioretti.it/?p=666
 https://web.archive.org/web/20120425152913/http://www.spazioforum.net/forum/topic/2537-filippo-mancuso-lascia-il-gruppo-di-forza-italia/
Sintesi delle accuse di Mancuso a Cesare Previti
Intervista a Filippo Mancuso dell'11 aprile 2002
Scheda dell'On. Mancuso sul sito della Camera dei deputati per la XIII Legislatura

1922 births
2011 deaths
Jurists from Palermo
Forza Italia politicians
Italian Ministers of Justice
Deputies of Legislature XIII of Italy
Deputies of Legislature XIV of Italy
Politicians from Palermo
20th-century Italian judges
University of Palermo alumni